Kathmandu 1 is one of 10 parliamentary constituencies of Kathmandu District in Nepal. This constituency came into existence on the Constituency Delimitation Commission (CDC) report submitted on 31 August 2017.

Incorporated areas
Kathmandu 1 parliamentary constituency consist area of ward number 10, 11, 29 and 31 of Kathmandu Metropolitan City.

Assembly segments
It encompasses the following Bagmati Province Provincial Assembly segment
 Kathmandu 1(A) - ward no. 11,29
 Kathmandu 1(B)- ward no. 10,31

Members of Parliament

Parliament/Constituent Assembly

Provincial Assembly

1(A)

1(B)

Election results

Election in the 2020s

2022 general election

2022 provincial elections

Kathmandu 1(A)

Kathmandu 1(B)

Election in the 2010s

2017 general election

2017 provincial elections

Kathmandu 1(A)

Kathmandu 1(B)

2013 Constituent Assembly election

Election in the 2000s

2008 Constituent Assembly election

Election in the 1990s

1999 legislative election

1997 by-election

1994 legislative election

1994 by-election

1991 legislative election

See also
 List of parliamentary constituencies of Nepal

References

External links
Constituency map of Kathmandu

Parliamentary constituencies of Nepal
Kathmandu